Joshua Ndere Makonjio (27 July 1981 – 18 November 2011) was a Kenyan amateur boxer.

Career
Ndere represented Kenya at African, Commonwealth and World Championship level. As a light heavyweight boxer he was a bronze medallist at the 2006 Commonwealth Games in Melbourne, the 2007 All-Africa Games in Algiers and 2010 Commonwealth Games in Delhi. He made the second round of the 2009 World Amateur Boxing Championships. 

Due to his military commitments, he missed out on the 2008 Summer Olympics, which he was considered likely to have qualified for.

Death
While driving near Samburu in 2011, Ndere was killed in a head-on crash with an on-coming vehicle. He had just started annual leave and was on the road to Nairobi from his Mombasa base.

References

External links
 

1981 births
2011 deaths
Kenyan male boxers
Commonwealth Games bronze medallists for Kenya
Commonwealth Games medallists in boxing
Boxers at the 2006 Commonwealth Games
Boxers at the 2010 Commonwealth Games
Road incident deaths in Kenya
African Games medalists in boxing
Light-heavyweight boxers
African Games bronze medalists for Kenya
Competitors at the 2007 All-Africa Games
Medallists at the 2006 Commonwealth Games
Medallists at the 2010 Commonwealth Games